Highlife is a studio album by American jazz guitarist Sonny Sharrock. It was recorded at Jersey City's Quantum Sound Studio in October 1990 and released later that same year by Enemy Records.

Critical reception
In a contemporary review for The Village Voice, Robert Christgau gave Highlife an "A" and called it a "gorgeously straightforward guitar record" from someone whose musical principles reflect "a genius son" of Jimmy Smith and Jimi Hendrix. He said Sharrock expresses his themes in a dignified manner, with variation in timbre more so than in harmony, while committing to both cacophony and melody in his exploration of jazz and rock traditions. Christgau named it the sixth best album of the year in his list for the Pazz & Jop critics poll. In The Philadelphia Inquirer, jazz critic Francis Davis hailed Highlife as "instrumental-pop at its most energetic and uncontrived". She felt the "vivacious" record was more "pop" than "jazz" but nonetheless a "persuasive argument for the advantages of maturity" in which Sharrock embraced "simplicity and directness, qualities you'd never have expected from him twenty-five years ago".

In The Penguin Guide to Jazz (1992), Richard Cook and Brian Morton gave Highlife three out of four stars and found it more polished than Sharrock's previous records but with "bass-heavy" jazz fusion exercises that showed potential for more in the future. AllMusic's Steve Huey was less enthusiastic, giving it three out of five stars and deeming it "something of a transitional album, catching Sharrock in the midst of figuring out where to take his music next, yet that searching quality makes it a compelling listen for fans".

Track listing

Personnel 
Credits are adapted from the album's liner notes.

 Charles Baldwin – bass guitar
 Lance Carter, Abe Speller – drums
 Francis Manzella – recording, mixing and co-producer
 Michael Knuth – executive producer
 Sonny Sharrock – guitar, production
 Dave Snider – Korg M1, Korg Wavestation

References

External links 
 

1990 albums
Sonny Sharrock albums
Enemy Records albums